Lobynets is a rural locality (a selo) in Lapshinskoye Rural Settlement, Kotovsky District, Volgograd Oblast, Russia. The population was 22 as of 2010.

Geography 
Lobynets is located in steppe, on Volga Upland, 15 km northeast of Kotovo (the district's administrative centre) by road. Lapshinskaya is the nearest rural locality.

References 

Rural localities in Kotovsky District